The Kuwait national under-17 football team is the youth association football team representing Kuwait in youth competitions and it is controlled by the Kuwait Football Association.

Participation in Tournaments

AFC U-16 Championship
 1985: Withdrew
 1986 to 1994: DNQ
 1996: Group Stage
 1998: DNQ 
 2000: Group stage
 2002: DNQ
 2004: Quarterfinals
 2006 to 2008: DNQ
 2010: Group stage
 2012: Quarterfinals
 2014: Group stage
 2016 to 2018: Suspended

FIFA U-17 World Cup
 1985 to 2015: DNQ
 2017 to 2019: Suspended

See also
 Kuwait national football team 
 Kuwait national under-23 football team
 Kuwait women's national football team 

u17
Asian national under-17 association football teams